The Armenian Apostolic Church is the national church of Armenia.

List of cathedrals
 Etchmiadzin Cathedral in Vagharshapat (seat of the Mother See of Holy Etchmiadzin). 
 Saint Gregory the Illuminator Cathedral in Yerevan (main cathedral of the capital Yerevan).
 Saint Mesrop Mashtots Cathedral of Oshakan (seat of the Diocese of Aragatzotn). 
 Saint Sarkis Cathedral of Yerevan (seat of the Araratian Pontifical Diocese).
 Holy Mother of God of Vagharshapat (seat of the Diocese of Armavir).
 Holy Mother of God Cathedral of Gavar (seat of the Diocese of Gegharkounik).
 Saint Gregory of Narek Cathedral of Vanadzor (seat of the Diocese of Gougark).
 Kecharis Monastery of Tsaghkadzor (seat of the Diocese of Kotayk). 
 Holy Mother of God Cathedral of Gyumri (seat of the Diocese of Shirak).
 Saint Gregory Cathedral of Goris (seat of the Diocese of Syunik). 
 Surp Nerses Cathedral of Ijevan (seat of the Diocese of Tavush).
 Holy Mother of God Cathedral of Yeghegnadzor (seat of the Diocese of Vayots Dzor).
 Cathedral of the Holy Martyrs in  Gyumri (Eastern Catholic)

See also
Religion in Armenia
Lists of cathedrals by country

References

Armenia
Churches in Armenia
Cathedrals
Cathedrals